Jay Scott Kaufman (born July 26, 1963) is a professor in the Department of Epidemiology, Biostatistics, & Occupational Health at McGill University, where he was a Canada Research Chair in Health Disparities (2010-2017). He also served (2020-2021) as the President of the Society for Epidemiological Research.

References

External links
Faculty Website at McGill University
Biography at Society for Epidemiologic Research

Living people
1963 births
Academic staff of McGill University
University of North Carolina at Chapel Hill faculty
University of Michigan alumni
Canada Research Chairs
American epidemiologists
Canadian epidemiologists